Pseudoterinaea is a genus of longhorn beetles of the subfamily Lamiinae, containing the following species:

 Pseudoterinaea bicoloripes (Pic, 1926)
 Pseudoterinaea densepunctata (Breuning, 1954)
 Pseudoterinaea indica Breuning, 1940
 Pseudoterinaea nigerrima Breuning, 1964
 Pseudoterinaea seticornis (Gressitt, 1940)

References

Desmiphorini